Schaus or Schauss is a German-language surname of Luxembourgian origin. Notable people with the surname include::

  (1906 - 1972), Hessian politician (FDP)
 Eugène Schaus, Luxembourgian politician
 Dupong-Schaus Ministry, the government of Luxembourg (1947-1951)
 Werner-Schaus Ministry I, the government of Luxembourg (1959-1964)
 Werner-Schaus Ministry II, the government of Luxembourg (1969-1974)
 Fred Schaus, American basketball coach and player
  (born 1955), Hessian politician (Die Linke)
  (born 1945), German footballer
 Lambert Schaus (1908-1976), Luxembourgian politician
 Magdalene Schauss-Flake (1921-2008), German composer and organist
 Molly Schaus, American ice hockey goaltender
 Nadja Schaus (born 1984), German volleyball player
 Nick Schaus (born 1986), an American professional ice hockey player
  (born 1951), German handball player
 William Schaus, American entomologist
 Schausia, a genus of moths named in honor of William Schaus

See also 
 Schaus Ice Rises, a group of small ice rises in Wilkins Ice Shelf
 Schaus's crow (Euploea blossomae), a butterfly endemic to the Philippines
 Schaus' swallowtail (Papilio aristodemus), a species of American butterfly in the family Papilionidae

German-language surnames
Surnames of Luxembourgian origin